Ann Dunlop Alexander (16 March 1896 – 1969) was a Scottish artist, active during the first half of the 20th-century, who painted in oils and watercolours, designed ceramics and illustrated books.

Biography
Alexander was the daughter of a Glasgow schoolmaster and attended Glasgow High School before studying art at the Glasgow School of Art from 1915 to 1919. She continued to live and work in Glasgow, and produced linoprints, woodcuts and black and white drawings. She also painted, illustrated books and decorated ceramics. She frequently chose literary subjects, particularly myths and legends, for her work which was clearly influenced by the style of the decorative work of other Glasgow artists, including Jessie M. King and Ann Macbeth. Despite a number of career breaks, between 1919 and 1966, Alexander was a regular exhibitor at both the Royal Scottish Academy and the Royal Glasgow Institute of the Fine Arts, showing some eleven pieces at the former and 19 at the latter.

She died in Glasgow in 1969.

References

1896 births
1969 deaths
Date of death missing
20th-century Scottish painters
20th-century Scottish women artists
Alumni of the Glasgow School of Art
Artists from Glasgow
Glasgow School
Scottish illustrators
Scottish women painters